There are 300 municipalities in the canton of Vaud, Switzerland,. Vaud is the canton with the 2nd most municipalities (after Bern).

List 

 Aclens
 Agiez
 Aigle
 Allaman
 Arnex-sur-Nyon
 Arnex-sur-Orbe
 Arzier
 Assens
 Aubonne
 Avenches
 Ballaigues
 Ballens
 Bassins
 Baulmes
 Bavois
 Begnins
 Belmont-sur-Lausanne
 Belmont-sur-Yverdon
 Bercher
 Berolle
 Bettens
 Bex
 Bière
 Bioley-Magnoux
 Blonay - Saint-Légier
 Bofflens
 Bogis-Bossey
 Bonvillars
 Borex
 Bottens
 Bougy-Villars
 Boulens
 Bourg-en-Lavaux
 Bournens
 Boussens
 Bremblens
 Bretigny-sur-Morrens
 Bretonnières
 Buchillon
 Bullet
 Bursinel
 Bursins
 Burtigny
 Bussigny
 Bussy-sur-Moudon
 Chamblon
 Champagne
 Champtauroz
 Champvent
 Chardonne
 Château-d'Oex
 Chavannes-de-Bogis
 Chavannes-des-Bois
 Chavannes-le-Chêne
 Chavannes-le-Veyron
 Chavannes-près-Renens
 Chavannes-sur-Moudon
 Chavornay
 Chêne-Pâquier
 Cheseaux-Noréaz
 Cheseaux-sur-Lausanne
 Chéserex
 Chessel
 Chevilly
 Chevroux
 Chexbres
 Chigny
 Clarmont
 Coinsins
 Commugny
 Concise
 Coppet
 Corbeyrier
 Corcelles-le-Jorat
 Corcelles-près-Concise
 Corcelles-près-Payerne
 Corseaux
 Corsier-sur-Vevey
 Cossonay
 Crans-près-Céligny
 Crassier
 Crissier
 Cronay
 Croy
 Cuarnens
 Cuarny
 Cudrefin
 Cugy
 Curtilles
 Daillens
 Démoret
 Denens
 Denges
 Dizy
 Dompierre
 Donneloye
 Duillier
 Dully
 Echallens
 Echandens
 Echichens
 Eclépens
 Ecublens
 Epalinges
 Ependes
 Essertines-sur-Rolle
 Essertines-sur-Yverdon
 Etagnières
 Etoy
 Eysins
 Faoug
 Féchy
 Ferreyres
 Fey
 Fiez
 Fontaines-sur-Grandson
 Forel
 Founex
 Froideville
 Genolier
 Giez
 Gilly
 Gimel
 Gingins
 Givrins
 Gland
 Gollion
 Goumoëns
 Grancy
 Grandcour
 Grandevent
 Grandson
 Grens
 Gryon
 Hautemorges
 Henniez
 Hermenches
 Jongny
 Jorat-Menthue
 Jorat-Mézières
 Jouxtens-Mézery
 Juriens
 L'Abbaye
 L'Abergement
 L'Isle
 La Chaux
 La Praz
 La Rippe
 La Sarraz
 La Tour-de-Peilz
 Lausanne
 Lavey-Morcles
 Lavigny
 Le Chenit
 Le Lieu
 Le Mont-sur-Lausanne
 Le Vaud
 Les Clées
 Leysin
 Lignerolle
 Lonay
 Longirod
 Lovatens
 Lucens
 Luins
 Lully
 Lussery-Villars
 Lussy-sur-Morges
 Lutry
 Maracon
 Marchissy
 Mathod
 Mauborget
 Mauraz
 Mex
 Mies
 Missy
 Moiry
 Mollens
 Molondin
 Mont-la-Ville
 Mont-sur-Rolle
 Montagny-près-Yverdon
 Montanaire
 Montcherand
 Montilliez
 Montpreveyres
 Montreux
 Montricher
 Morges
 Morrens
 Moudon
 Mutrux
 Novalles
 Noville
 Nyon
 Ogens
 Ollon
 Onnens
 Oppens
 Orbe
 Orges
 Ormont-Dessous
 Ormont-Dessus
 Orny
 Oron
 Orzens
 Oulens-sous-Echallens
 Pailly
 Paudex
 Payerne
 Penthalaz
 Penthaz
 Penthéréaz
 Perroy
 Poliez-Pittet
 Pompaples
 Pomy
 Prangins
 Premier
 Préverenges
 Prévonloup
 Prilly
 Provence
 Puidoux
 Pully
 Rances
 Renens
 Rennaz
 Rivaz
 Roche
 Rolle
 Romainmôtier-Envy
 Romanel-sur-Lausanne
 Romanel-sur-Morges
 Ropraz
 Rossenges
 Rossinière
 Rougemont
 Rovray
 Rueyres
 Saint-Barthélemy
 Saint-Cergue
 Saint-George
 Saint-Livres
 Saint-Oyens
 Saint-Prex
 Saint-Saphorin
 Saint-Sulpice
 Sainte-Croix
 Saubraz
 Savigny
 Senarclens
 Sergey
 Servion
 Signy-Avenex
 Suchy
 Sullens
 Suscévaz
 Syens
 Tannay
 Tartegnin
 Tévenon
 Tolochenaz
 Trélex
 Trey
 Treycovagnes
 Treytorrens
 Ursins
 Valbroye
 Valeyres-sous-Montagny
 Valeyres-sous-Rances
 Valeyres-sous-Ursins
 Vallorbe
 Vaulion
 Vaux-sur-Morges
 Vevey
 Veytaux
 Vich
 Villars-Epeney
 Villars-le-Comte
 Villars-le-Terroir
 Villars-Sainte-Croix
 Villars-sous-Yens
 Villarzel
 Villeneuve
 Vinzel
 Vuarrens
 Vucherens
 Vufflens-la-Ville
 Vufflens-le-Château
 Vugelles-La Mothe
 Vuiteboeuf
 Vulliens
 Vullierens
 Vully-les-Lacs
 Yens
 Yverdon-les-Bains
 Yvonand
 Yvorne

Mergers
On 1 January 1961:

the municipalities of Bussy-sur-Morges and Chardonney-sur-Morges merged to form Bussy-Chardonney
In 1962: the municipalities Montreux-Châtelard and Montreux-Planches merged to form Montreux
On 1 January 1970: the municipalities of Lavey and Morcles merged to form Lavey-Morcles
On 1 January 1970:the municipalities of Romainmôtier and Envy merged to form Romainmôtier-Envy.
On 1 January 1999:the municipalities of Lussery and Villars-Lussery merged to form Lussery-Villars.
On 1 January 2002:the municipalities of Champmartin and Cudrefin merged under the name of Cudrefin.
On 1 January 2003:the municipalities of La Rogivue and Maracon formed the municipality Maracon.
On 1 January 2005:the municipalities of Arrissoules and Rovray formed the municipality Rovray.
On 1 January 2006:the municipalities of Villarzel, Rossens and Sédeilles merged to form Villarzel.
On 1 January 2006:the municipalities of Avenches and Donatyre merged to form Avenches.
On 1 January 2008:the municipalities of Donneloye, Gossens and Mézery-près-Donneloye merged to form Donneloye
On 1 January 2009:the municipalities of Assens and Malapalud merged to form Assens.
On 1 July 2011:the municipalities of Aubonne and Pizy merged to form Aubonne
the municipalities of Avenches and Oleyres merged to form Avenches 
the municipalities of Bellerive, Chabrey, Constantine, Montmagny, Mur, Vallamand and Villars-le-Grand merged to form Vully-les-Lacs
 the municipalities of Dommartin, Naz, Poliez-le-Grand and Sugnens merged to form Montilliez
 the municipalities of Éclagnens, Goumoens-la-Ville and Goumoens-le-Jux merged to form Goumoëns
 the municipalities of Montaubion-Chardonney, Peney-le-Jorat, Sottens, Villars-Mendraz and Villars-Tiercelin merged to form Jorat-Menthue
 the municipalities of Fontanezier, Romairon, Vaugondry and Villars-Burquin merged to form Tévenon
 the municipalities of Cully, Epesses, Grandvaux, Riex and Villette (Lavaux) merged to form Bourg-en-Lavaux
 the municipalities of Colombier, Echichens, Monnaz and Saint-Saphorin-sur-Morges merged to form Echichens
 the municipalities of Lucens and Oulens-sur-Lucens merged to form Lucens
 the municipalities of Cerniaz, Combremont-le-Grand, Combremont-le-Petit, Granges-près-Marnand, Marnand, Sassel, Seigneux and Villars-Bramard merged to form Valbroye
 the municipalities of Gressy and Yverdon-les-Bains merged to form Yverdon-les-Bains
 On 1 January 2012: the municipalities of Bussigny-sur-Oron, Châtillens, Chesalles-sur-Oron, Ecoteaux, Oron-la-Ville, Oron-le-Châtel, Palézieux, Les Tavernes, Les Thioleyres and Vuibroye merged to form Oron
 On 1 January 2013: the municipalities of Chapelle-sur-Moudon, Correvon, Denezy, Martherenges, Neyruz-sur-Moudon, Peyres-Possens, Saint-Cierges, Thierrens and Chanéaz merged to form Montanaire
 On 1 July 2016: the municipalities of Carrouge, Ferlens and Mézières merged to form Jorat-Mézières
 On 1 January 2017: the municipalities of Corcelles-sur-Chavornay and Essert-Pittet merged into Chavornay
 the municipalities of Brenles, Chesalles-sur-Moudon, Cremin, Forel-sur-Lucens and Sarzens merged into Lucens
 On 1 January 2021: the municipalities of Aubonne and Montherod merged into Aubonne
 On 1 July 2021: the municipalities of Apples, Cottens, Pampigny, Sévery, Bussy-Chardonney and Reverolle merged into Hautemorges
 the municipalities of Assens and Bioley-Orjulaz merged into Assens
 On 1 January 2022: the municipalities of Blonay and Saint-Légier-La Chiésaz merged into Blonay - Saint-Légier
 the municipalities of Essertes and Oron merged into Oron

References 

Vaud
Subdivisions of the canton of Vaud